= Combat Noise =

Death metal band

- Born: 1995 (age 30–31)
- Origin: Havana, Cuba
- Genre: Death Metal
- Years active: 1995-present
- Labels: American Line Prods (Mex). Old Cemetery Recs, Butchered Recs y Sevared Recs (USA); Brutal Beatdown Recs (Cuba); Legion of Death Recs (Francia); Nocturnal Recs (Perú), Satanath Recs (Georgia), Sanatorio Recs (Costa Rica)
- Members: Juan Carlos Torrente (Vocals) Jorge L. (Colo) Reyes (Guits) Yanio Lee (Guits) Boris Marrero (Bass) Pedro Cruz (Drums)

Combat Noise is a Cuban Death Metal band inspired by Florida’s Death Metal. It emerged in 1995 in La Habana, Cuba. The band became a headliner around the island at Brutal Fest, Ciudad Metal fest, Metal HG fest, Maxim Rock fest, and Atenas Rock fest.

== History ==
In 1996 Combat Noise recorded their first demo: “Marching of Terror” and after that a single: “Soldiers Must Like to Kill” (1998); other demos followed, such as “For Military Supremacy” (1999), “Awakening in Holocaust” (2001), “Radical with the Warenemy” (2002) and “Under my rifle’s fire” (2003)

In 2004 the band recorded their first album at Marine’s Home Studios, entitled: After the War… The Wrath Continues, released by the Mexican label American Line Prods”in 2008. Frontline Offensive Force was recorded in 2009 and released in 2020 by Brutal Beatdown Recs (Cuba/France) and re-released in 2011 by US labels Old Cemetery Recs, Butchered Recs and Severed Recs. In 2022, Nocturnal Recs and Ataraxia Prods from Peru made another edition in CD, cassette and 12”LP formats.

In 2012, the band recorded Anthems of Carnage, which had their first CD copies thanks to “Scriptorium Prods” (Cuba). That year Brutal Beatdown Recs released the album and in 2015, American Line Recs re-released it. One year after, Legion of Death Recs (France) made 300 copies of the 7”EP: In War We Trust The album To the Heart of the Battle (2023) was released in May 2024 by Satanath Recs from Georgia and Sanatorio Recs from Costa Rica.

== Themes ==
Combat Noise lyrics are based on stories of war, brutality and destruction; recreating stories of courage, honour, brotherhood… but also cruelty, fear and horror. The band supports no religion or political ideology.
